Rachel McQuillan and Claudia Porwik were the defending champions, but lost in the quarterfinals to Ginger Helgeson and Shannan McCarthy.

Alexia Dechaume and Florencia Labat won the title by defeating Helgeson and McCarthy 6–3, 1–6, 6–2 in the final.

Seeds

Draw

Draw

References

External links
 Official results archive (ITF)
 Official results archive (WTA)

Women's Doubles
Doubles